Drozdovka was a rural locality (an inhabited locality) in administrative jurisdiction of the closed administrative-territorial formation of  Ostrovnoy in Murmansk Oblast, Russia, located on the Kola Peninsula beyond the Arctic Circle at the elevation of  above sea level.

History
In 1934, the Murmansk Okrug Executive Committee developed a redistricting proposal, which was approved by the Resolution of the 4th Plenary Session of the Murmansk Okrug Committee of the VKP(b) on December 28-29, 1934 and by the Resolution of the Presidium of the Murmansk Okrug Executive Committee on February 2, 1935. On February 15, 1935, the VTsIK approved the redistricting of the okrug into seven districts, although it did not specify what territories the new districts were to include. On February 26, 1935, the Presidium of the Leningrad Oblast Executive Committee worked out the details of the new district scheme and issued a resolution, which, among other things, transferred Drozdovka from Teribersky District to Saamsky District.

Due to depopulation, it was abolished effective July 3, 2013.

References

Notes

Sources

Abolished inhabited localities in Murmansk Oblast
